Pol is a male given name. In Europe, it can be a form of Paul or Polydore, and sometimes of Apollonius or Leopold. It is most common in Belgium, Luxembourg, Andorra, and Spain. The name in Cambodia and Thailand likely has a different origin. People with this name include:

 Pol Abraham (1891–1966), French architect
 Pol Albrecht (1874–1975), Luxembourg composer, conductor and bandmaster
 Pol Amat (born 1978), Spanish field hockey player
 Pol Anoul (1922–1990), Belgian footballer
 Pol Antràs (born 1975), Spanish economist
 Pol Arias (born 1996), Andorran swimmer
 Pol Boël (1923–2007), Belgian industrialist and politician, grandson of Pol-Clovis
 Pol Clovis Boël (1868–1941), Belgian industrialist and politician
 Pol Braekman (1919–1994), Belgian sprinter
 Pol Bueso (born 1985), Spanish football defender
 Pol Bury (1922–2005), Belgian sculptor
 Pol Calvet (born 1994), Spanish football midfielder
 Pol Carreras (born 1990), Spanish alpine skier
 Pol Chomchuen (born 1959), Thai football coach
 Pol Cruchten (born 1963), Luxembourgian film director and producer
 Pol Demeuter (1904–1934), Belgian motorcycle racer
 Pol Duwez (1907–1984), Belgian material scientist
 Pol Espargaró (born 1991), Spanish Grand Prix motorcycle racer
 Pol Freixanet (born 1991), Spanish football goalkeeper
 Pol García (born 1995), Spanish football defender
 Pol Goffaux (1916–1977), Belgian boxer 
 Pol Goossen (born 1949), Belgian film and television actor
 Pol Greisch (born 1930), Luxembourg writer
 Pol Heyvaert, Belgian stage director and designer
 Pol Hom (born 1946), Cambodian politician
 Pol Hoste (born 1947), Belgian writer
 Alen Pol Kobryn (born 1949), American poet, novelist, and voice actor
 Pol Le Gourrierec (born 1921), French diplomat
 Pol de Leon (Paul Aurelian) (died 575), Welsh-Bréton cleric and saint
 Pol Lirola (born 1997), Spanish football defender
 Pol Llonch (born 1992), Spanish football midfielder
 Pol Medina Jr. (born 1962), Filipino cartoonist
 Pol Mercier (1819–1874), French playwright
 Pol de Mont (1857–1931), Belgian writer and poet
 Pol Moya (born 1996), Andorran middle-distance runner
 Pol Perritt (1891–1947), American baseball pitcher
 Pol Pla (born 1993), Spanish rugby player
 Pol Plançon (1851–1914), French operatic bass
 Pol Pot (1925–1998), Cambodian revolutionary and Communist dictator
 Pol Roigé (born 1994), Spanish football midfielder
 Pol Rosell (born 1991), Spanish racing driver
 Pol Sax (born 1960), Luxembourg writer
 Pol Schmoetten (born 1958), Luxembourg writer
 Pol Swings (1906–1983), Belgian astrophysicist
 Pol Theis (born 1991), Luxembourger attorney and interior designer
 Pol Toledo Bagué (born 1994), Spanish tennis player
 Pol Valentín (born 1997), Spanish football defender
 Pol Verschuere (born 1955), Belgian former road bicycle racer

See also
 Pól, an Irish and Faroese given name
 Pol (disambiguation), for other uses

Masculine given names